David Kavanagh (1 March 1887 – 5 August 1965) was an Irish hurler. His championship career with the Wexford team spanned the first two decades of the 20th century.

Kavanagh was born in Ballylucas, County Wexford to the former Mary Murphy and John Kavanagh. After a brief education he spent his working life as a farmer. Kavanagh first played competitive hurling with the Castlebridge club. Throughout his club career he won two county senior championship medals.

After impressing on the club scene, Kavanagh was quickly added to the Wexford inter-county team. He won his only All-Ireland medal in 1910. Kavanagh had earlier won a Leinster medal before winning a second winners' medal in 1918.

Kavanagh died on 5 August 1965 aged 78.

Honours

Castlebridge
Wexford Senior Hurling Championship (2): 1910, 1919

Wexford
All-Ireland Senior Hurling Championship (1): 1910
Leinster Senior Hurling Championship (2): 1910, 1918

References

1887 births
1965 deaths
Castlebridge hurlers
Wexford inter-county hurlers
All-Ireland Senior Hurling Championship winners